Health realization (HR) is a resiliency approach to personal and community psychology first developed in the 1980s by Roger C. Mills and George Pransky, and based on ideas and insights these psychologists elaborated from attending the lectures of philosopher and author Sydney Banks. HR first became known for its application in economically  and socially marginalized communities living in highly stressful circumstances (see Community Applications below).

HR focuses on the nature of thought and how it affects one's experience of the world.  Students of HR are taught that they can change how they react to their circumstances by becoming aware that they are creating their own experience as they respond to their thoughts, and by connecting to their "innate health" and "inner wisdom."

HR also goes under the earlier name of "Psychology of Mind" and most recently "Three Principles" understanding.

The health realization model
In the Health Realization ("HR") model, all psychological phenomena, from severe disorder to glowing health, are presented as manifestations of three operative "principles" first formulated as principles of human experience by Sydney Banks:
 Mind - the universal energy that animates all of life, the source of innate health and well-being.
 Consciousness - the ability to be aware of one's life.
 Thought - the power to think and thereby to create one's experience of reality.

"Mind" has been likened to the electricity running a movie projector, and "Thought" to the images on the film. "Consciousness" is likened to the light from the projector that throws the images onto the screen, making them appear real.

According to HR, people experience their reality and their circumstances through the constant filter of their thoughts.  Consciousness makes that filtered reality seem "the way it really is." People react to it as if this were true. But, when their thinking changes, reality seems different and their reactions change. Thus, according to HR, people are constantly creating their own experience of reality via their thinking.

People tend to experience their reality as stressful, according to HR, when they are having insecure or negative thoughts. But HR suggests that such thoughts do not have to be taken seriously. When one chooses to take them more lightly, according to HR, the mind quiets down and positive feelings emerge spontaneously. Thus, HR also teaches that people have health and well-being already within them (in HR this is known as "innate health"), ready to emerge as soon as their troubled thinking calms down. When this happens, according to HR, people also gain access to common sense, and they can tap into the universal capacity for creative problem solving or "inner wisdom." Anecdotal reports suggest that, when a person grasps the understanding behind HR in an experiential way, an expansive sense of emotional freedom and well-being can result.

Health realization as therapy
In contrast to psychotherapies that focus on the content of the clients' dysfunctional thinking, HR focuses on "innate health" and the role of "Mind, Thought, and Consciousness" in creating the clients' experience of life.

The HR counselor does not attempt to get clients to change their thoughts, "think positive", or "reframe" negative thoughts to positive ones. According to HR, one's ability to control one's thoughts is limited and the effort to do so can itself be a source of stress. Instead, clients are encouraged to consider that their "minds are using thought to continuously determine personal reality at each moment."

HR characterizes feelings and emotions as indicators of the quality of one's thinking. Within the HR model, unpleasant feelings or emotions, or stressful feelings, indicate that one's thinking is based on insecurity, negative beliefs, conditioning or learned patterns that are not necessarily appropriate to the live moment here and now. They simultaneously indicate that the individual has temporarily lost sight of what HR asserts is his or her own role in creating experience. Pleasant or desired feelings (such as a sense of well-being, gratitude, compassion, peace, etc.) indicate, within the HR model, that the quality of one's thinking is exactly as it needs to be.

HR holds that the therapeutic "working through" of personal issues from the past to achieve wholeness is unnecessary. According to the HR model, people are already whole and healthy. The traumas of the past are only important to the extent that the individual lets them influence his or her thoughts in the present. According to HR, one's "issues" and memories are just thoughts, and the individual can react to them or not. The more the clients' experience is that they themselves are creating their own painful feelings via their own "power of Thought," HR suggests, the less these feelings bother them. Sedgeman has compared this to what happens when we make scary faces at ourselves in the mirror: because we know it is just us, it is impossible to scare ourselves that way.

Thus HR deals with personal insecurities and dysfunctional patterns almost en masse, aiming for an understanding of the "key role of thought", an understanding that ideally allows the individual to step free at once from a large number of different patterns all connected by insecure thinking. With this approach, it is rare for the practitioner to delve into specific content beyond the identification of limiting thoughts. When specific thoughts are considered to be limiting or based on insecurity or conditioning, the counselor encourages the individual to disengage from them.

Relationships
From the perspective of HR, relationship problems result from the partners' low awareness of their role in creating their own experience via thought and consciousness. Partners who respond to HR reportedly stop blaming and recriminating and react to each other differently. HR counselors aim to get couples to consider that each one's own feelings are not determined by one's partner and that the great majority of issues that previously snarled their interactions were based on insecure, negative, and conditioned thinking. HR counselors further suggest that every person goes through emotional ups and downs and that one's thinking in a "down" mood is likely to be distorted. HR teaches that it is generally counterproductive to try to "talk through" relationship problems when the partners are in a bad mood. Instead HR suggests that partners wait until each has calmed down and is able to discuss things from a place of inner comfort and security.

Chemical dependency and addiction 
HR sees chemical dependency and related behaviors as a response to a lack of a sense of self-efficacy, rather than the result of disease. That is, some people who are, in HR terms, "unaware" of their own "innate health" and their own role in creating stress via their thoughts turn to alcohol, drugs, or other compulsive behaviors in the attempt to quell their stressful feelings and regain some momentary sense of control.  HR aims to offer deeper relief by showing that negative and stressful feelings are self-generated and thus can be self-quieted and it seeks to provide a pathway to well-being that does not depend on external circumstances.

Community applications
The Health Realization ("HR") model has been applied in a variety of challenging settings.  An early project, which garnered national publicity under the leadership of Roger Mills, introduced HR to residents of a pair of low-income housing developments in Miami known as Modello and Homestead Gardens. After three years, there were major documented reductions in crime, drug dealing, teenage pregnancy, child abuse, child neglect, school absenteeism, unemployment, and families on public assistance. Jack Pransky has chronicled the transformation that unfolded there, in his book Modello, A Story of Hope for the Inner City and Beyond.

Later projects in some of the most severely violence-ridden housing developments in New York, Minnesota, and California and in other communities in California, Hawaii, and Colorado built upon the early experience in the Modello/Homestead work. The Coliseum Gardens housing complex in Oakland, California, for example, had previously had the fourth highest homicide rate of such a complex in the US, but after HR classes were launched, the homicide rate began to decline. Gang warfare and ethnic clashes between Cambodian and African-American youth ceased. In 1997, Sargeant Jerry Williams was awarded the California Wellness Foundation Peace Prize on behalf of the Health Realization Community Empowerment Project at Coliseum Gardens. By the year 2006, there had been no homicides in the Complex for nine straight years.

The HR model has also found application in police departments, prisons, mental health clinics, community health clinics and nursing, drug and alcohol rehabilitation programs, services for the homeless, schools, and a variety of state and local government programs. The County of Santa Clara, California, for example, has established a Health Realization Services Division which provides HR training to County employees and the public.  The Services Division "seeks to enhance the life of the individual by teaching the understanding of the psychological principles of Mind, Thought and Consciousness, and how these principles function to create our life experience," and to "enable them to live healthier and more productive lives so that the community becomes a model of health and wellness." The Department of Alcohol and Drug Services introduced HR in Santa Clara County in 1994. The Health Realization Services Division has an approved budget of over $800,000 (gross expenditure) for FY 2008, a 41% increase over 2007, at a time when a number of programs within the Alcohol and Drug Services Department have sustained budget cuts.

HR community projects have received grant funding from a variety of sources. For example, grant partners for the Visitacion Valley Community Resiliency Project, a five-year, multimillion-dollar community revitalization project, have included Wells Fargo Bank, Charles Schwab Corporation Foundation, Charles and Helen Schwab Foundation, Isabel Allende Foundation, Pottruck Family Foundation, McKesson Foundation, Richard and Rhoda Goldman Fund, S.H. Cowell Foundation, San Francisco Foundation, Evelyn & Walter Haas, Jr. Fund, Milagro Foundation, and Dresdner RCM Global Investors. Other projects based upon the HR approach have been funded by the National Institute of Mental Health, the U.S. Department of Justice, the National Institute on Drug Abuse, the California Wellness Foundation, and the Shinnyo-en Foundation.

Ongoing community projects organized by the Center for Sustainable Change, a non-profit organization founded by Dr. Roger Mills and Ami Chen Mills-Naim, are funded by the W.K. Kellogg Foundation. The Center for Sustainable Change works in partnership with grassroots organizations in Des Moines, Iowa; Charlotte, North Carolina; and the Mississippi Delta to bring Three Principles training to at-risk communities under the umbrella of the National Community Resiliency Project. The Center also works with schools, agencies and corporations.

Organizational applications
From the original applications, as people in the business world have been introduced to HR or the "Three Principles" (as the core understanding is known), they have started to bring these ideas into the business world they have come from. The approach has been introduced to people in medicine, law, investment and financial services, technology, marketing, manufacturing, publishing, and a variety of other commercial and financial roles. It has been reported anecdotally to have had significant impact in the areas of individual performance and development, teamwork, leadership, change and diversity. According to HR/Three Principles adherents, these results flow naturally as the individuals exposed to the ideas learn how their thoughts have been creating barriers to others and barriers to their own innate creativity, common sense, and well being. As people learn how to access their full potential more consistently, HR adherents say, they get better results with less effort and less stress in less time.

Two peer-reviewed articles on effectiveness with leadership development were published in professional journals in 2008 (ADHR) and 2009 (ODJ). See "Organizations and Business" section below (Polsfuss & Ardichvili).

Philosophical context
Health  Realization ("HR") rests on the non-academic philosophy of Sydney Banks, which Mr. Banks has expounded upon in several books. Mr. Banks was a day laborer with no education beyond ninth grade (age 14) in Scotland who, in 1973, reportedly had a profound insight into the nature of human experience.  Mr. Banks does not particularly attempt to position his ideas within the larger traditions of philosophy or religion; he is neither academically trained nor well read. His philosophy focuses on the illusory, thought-created nature of reality, the three principles of "Mind", "Thought", and "Consciousness", the potential relief of human suffering that can come from a fundamental shift in personal awareness and understanding and the importance of a direct, experiential grasp of these matters, as opposed to a mere intellectual comprehension or analysis. Mr.  Banks suggests that his philosophy is best understood not intellectually but by "listening for a positive feeling;" and a grasp of HR is said to come through a series of "insights," that is, shifts in experiential understanding.

Teaching of health realization
Health Realization ("HR"), like Sydney Banks's philosophy, is deliberately not taught as a set of "techniques" but as an experiential "understanding" that goes beyond a simple transfer of information. There are no steps, no uniformly appropriate internal attitudes, and no techniques within it. The "health of the helper" is considered crucial; that is, trainers or counselors ideally will "live in the understanding that allows them to enjoy life," and thereby continuously model their understanding of HR by staying calm and relaxed, not taking things personally, assuming the potential in others, displaying common sense, and listening respectfully to all. Facilitators ideally teach in the moment, from "what they know" (e.g. their own experience), trusting that they will find the right words to say and the right approach to use in the immediate situation to stimulate the students' understanding of the "Three Principles". Rapport with students and a positive mood in the session or class are more important than the specific content of the facilitator's presentation.

Evaluations of health realization
A 2007 peer-reviewed article evaluating the effectiveness of HR suggests that the results of residential substance abuse treatment structured around the teaching of HR are equivalent to those of treatment structured around 12-step programs. The authors note that "these results are consistent with the general findings in the substance abuse literature, which suggests that treatment generally yields benefits, irrespective of approach."

A small peer-reviewed study in preparation for a planned larger study evaluated the teaching of HR/Innate Health via a one-and-a-half-day seminar, as a stress- and anxiety-reduction intervention for HIV-positive patients. All but one of the eight volunteer participants in the study showed improved scores on the Brief Symptom Inventory after the seminar, and those participants who scored in the "psychiatric outpatient" range at the beginning of the seminar all showed improvement that was sustained upon follow-up one month later. The study's authors concluded that "The HR/IH psychoeducational approach deserves further study as a brief intervention for stress-reduction in HIV-positive patients."

A 2007 pilot study funded by the National Institutes of Health evaluated HR in lowering stress among Somali and Oromo refugee women who had experienced violence and torture in their homelands, but for whom Western-style psychotherapeutic treatment of trauma was not culturally  appropriate. The pilot study showed that "the use of HR with refugee trauma survivors was feasible, culturally acceptable, and relevant to the participants." In a post-intervention focus group, "many women reported using new strategies to calm down, quiet their minds and make healthier decisions." Co-investigator Cheryl Robertson, Assistant Professor in the School of Nursing at the University of Minnesota, was quoted as saying, "This is a promising intervention that doesn't involve the use of highly trained personnel. And it can be done in the community."

The Visitacion Valley Community Resiliency Project (VVCRP) was reviewed by an independent evaluator hired by the Pottruck Foundation.  Her final report notes that "Early program evaluation...found that the VVCRP was successful in reducing individuals’ feelings of depression and isolation, and increasing their sense of happiness and self-control. The cumulative evaluation research conducted on the VVCRP and the HR model in general concludes that HR is a powerful tool for changing individuals’ beliefs and behaviors." In the Summary of Case Studies, the report goes on to state, "The VVCRP was effective over a period of five years of sustained involvement in two major neighborhood institutions...at influencing not just individuals, but also organizational policies, practices, and culture. This level of organizational influence is impressive when the relatively modest level of VVCRP staff time and resources invested into making these changes is taken into account. The pivotal levers of change at each organization were individual leaders who were moved by the HR principles to make major changes in their own beliefs, attitudes, and behaviors, and then took the initiative to inspire, enable, and mandate similar changes within their organizations. This method of reaching "critical mass" of HR awareness within these organizations appears to be both efficient and effective when the leadership conditions are right. However, this pathway to change is vulnerable to the loss of the key individual leader."

Research efforts on effectiveness
Pransky has reviewed the research on HR (through 2001) in relation to its results for prevention and education, citing about 20 manuscripts, most of which were conference papers, and none peer-reviewed journal articles, although two were unpublished doctoral dissertations. (Kelley (2003) cites two more unpublished doctoral dissertations.) Pransky concludes, "Every study of Health Realization and its various incarnations, however weak or strong the design, has shown decreases in problem behaviors and internally experienced problems. This approach appears to reduce problem behaviors and to improve mental health and well-being. At the very least, this suggests the field of prevention should further examine the efficacy of this ... approach by conducting independent, rigorous, controlled, longitudinal studies...."

Since at least 2008 peer-reviewed professional journal articles on its effectiveness have been published. See C.L.Polsfuss, A.Ardichvili articles in "Organizations and Business" section below.

Criticism
In a criticism of the philosophy of Sydney Banks and, by implication, the HR approach, Bonelle Strickling, a psychotherapist and Professor of Philosophy, is quoted in an article in the Vancouver Sun as objecting that "it makes it appear as if people can, through straightforward positive thinking, 'choose' to transcend their troubled upbringings and begin leading a contented life." She goes on to say that "it can be depressing for people to hear it's supposed to be that easy. It hasn't been my experience that people can simply choose not to be negatively influenced by their past." Referring to Banks's own experience, she says, "Most people are not blessed with such a life-changing experience.... When most people change, it usually happens in a much more gradual way." Strickling, however, displays by her very criticism, a lack in understanding of the Health Realization approach which has nothing at all to do with "choosing" or "positive thinking".

The West Virginia Initiative for Innate Health (at West Virginia University Health Sciences Center), which promotes HR/Innate Health and the philosophy of Sydney Banks through teaching, writing, and research, was the center of controversy soon after its inception in 2000 as the Sydney Banks Institute for Innate Health. Initiated by Robert M. D'Alessandri, the Dean of the medical school there, the institute reportedly was criticized as pushing "junk science," and Banks's philosophy was characterized as "a kind of bastardized Buddhism" and "New Age." William Post, an orthopedic surgeon who quit the medical school because of the institute,  was reported along with other unnamed professors to have accused the Sydney Banks Institute of promoting religion in a state-funded institution, and Harvey Silvergate, a civil-liberties lawyer, was quoted as agreeing that "essentially [the institute] seems like a cover for a religious-type belief system which has been prettified in order to be secular and even scientific.” 

There is, however, no organised religion associated with the principles uncovered by Mr. Banks. 

A Dr. Blaha, who resigned as chairman of Orthopedics at WVU, was quoted as criticizing the institute as being part of a culture at the Health Sciences Center that, in his view, places too much emphasis on agreement, consensus, and getting along. Other professors reportedly supported the institute. 

Anthony DiBartolomeo, chief of the rheumatology section, was quoted as calling it "a valuable addition" to the health-sciences center, saying its greatest value was in helping students, residents, and patients deal with stress.

Reportedly in response to the controversy, the WVIIH  changed its name from The Sydney Banks Institute to the West Virginia Initiative for Innate Health, although its mission remains unchanged.

Support for specific tenets of HR from other philosophies and approaches
Some of the tenets of HR are consistent with the theories of philosophers, authors and researchers independently developing other approaches to change and psychotherapy.

A large body of peer-reviewed case literature in psychotherapy by Milton Erickson, M.D., founding president of the American Society for Clinical Hypnosis, and others working in the field of Ericksonian psychotherapy, supports the notion that lasting change in psychotherapy can occur rapidly without directly addressing clients' past problematic experiences.

Many case examples and a modest body of controlled outcome research in solution focused brief therapy (SFBT), have likewise supported the notion that change in psychotherapy can occur rapidly, without delving into the clients' past negative experiences. Proponents of SFBT suggest that such change often occurs when the therapist assists clients to step out of their usual problem-oriented thinking.

The philosophy of social constructionism, which is echoed in SFBT, asserts that reality is reproduced by people acting on their interpretations and their knowledge of it. (HR asserts that thought creates one's experience of the world.)

A major body of peer-reviewed research on "focusing", a change process developed by philosopher Eugene Gendlin, supports the theory that progress in psychotherapy is dependent on something clients do inside themselves during pauses in the therapy process, and that a particular internal activity "focusing" can be taught to help clients improve their progress. The first step of the six-step process used to teach focusing involves setting aside one's current worries and concerns to create a "cleared space" for effective inner reflection. Gendlin has called this first step by itself "a superior stress-reduction method". (HR emphasizes the importance of quieting one's insecure and negative thinking to reduce stress and gain access to "inner wisdom," "common sense," and well-being.)

Positive psychology emphasizes the human capacity for health and well-being, asserts the poor correlation between social circumstances and individual happiness, and insists on the importance of one's thinking in determining one's feelings.

Work by Herbert Benson argues that humans have an innate 'breakout principle' which provides creative solutions and peak experiences which allow the restoration of a 'new-normal' state of higher functioning. This breakout principle is activated by severing connections with current circular or repetitive thinking. This is heavily reminiscent of Health Realization discussion of the Principle of Mind and of how it is activated.

Finally, resilience research, such as that by Emmy Werner, has demonstrated that many high-risk children display resilience and develop into normal, happy adults despite problematic developmental histories.

See also National Resilience Resource Center LLC additional discussion of resilience research and complimentary science found on the Research page at http://www.nationalresilienceresource.com .

See also
Psychoneuroimmunology

References

Further reading
A number of writers have  produced books and articles that incorporate and elaborate the ideas on which health realization is based.   A partial list appears here. In addition, Sydney Banks has written several books, listed below, presenting his ideas, and his lectures are reproduced in a number of videotapes and audio CDs.

Community applications
Center for Sustainable Change, Awakening the Beloved Community: Report on Year 2 of the National Community Resiliency Project, 2010. Available online PDF version
C. L. Robertson, L. Halcon, S. J. Hoffman, N. Osman, A. Mohamed, E. Areba, K. Savik, & M. A. Mathiason. Health Realization Community Coping Intervention for Somali Refugee Women. Journal of Immigrant and Minority Health, 21, 2019, pp. 1077–1084. 
L. L. Halcón, C. L. Robertson, K. A. Monson, & C. C. Claypatch A Theoretical Framework for Using Health Realization to Reduce Stress and Improve Coping in Refugee Communities. Journal of Holistic Nursing, 25(3), 2007, pp. 186–194.
R.C. Mills and E. Spittle, The Health Realization Primer, Lone Pine Publishing. 2003. , 
J. Pransky, Modello: A Story of Hope for the Inner City and Beyond: An Inside-Out Model of Prevention and Resiliency in Action through Health Realization, NEHRI Publications 1998. , 
Thomas M. Kelley, William F. Pettit Jr., Judith A. Sedgeman & Jack B. Pransky (2021), Psychiatry’s pursuit of euthymia: another wild goose chase or an opportunity for principle-based facilitation?, International Journal of Psychiatry in Clinical Practice, 25:4, 333-335

General
M. Neill, The Inside-Out Revolution, Hay House Inc, 2013, 
J. Bailey, Slowing Down to the Speed of Love, McGraw-Hill, 2004. , 
R. Carlson, You Can be Happy No Matter What, 2nd ed., New World Library 1997. , 
R. Carlson and J. Bailey, Slowing Down to the Speed of Life, HarperSanFrancisco 1998. , 
T.M. Kelley, Falling in Love with Life, Bookman 2004. , 
R.C. Mills, Realizing Mental Health: Toward a new Psychology of Resiliency, Sulberger & Graham Publishing, Ltd. 1995. 
R.C. Mills and E. Spittle, The Wisdom Within, Lone Pine Publishing. 2001. , 
J. Pransky, Somebody Should Have Told Us, Airleaf Publishing 2006. , 
E. Spittle, Wisdom for Life, Lone Pine Publishing. 2005. , 
S.G. Wartel, A Strengths-Based Practice Model: Psychology of Mind and Health Realization, Families in Society: The Journal of Contemporary Human Services, pp. 185 – 191, 84(2) 2003;

Organizations and business

R.C. Kausen, We've Got to Start Meeting Like This, Life Education 2003. , 
R.C. Kausen, Customer Satisfaction Guaranteed, Life Education 1989. , 
C.L. Polsfuss & A.Ardichvili, "Three Principles Psychology: Applications in Leadership Development & Coaching", Advances in Developing Human Resources Journal, 2008; 10; 671 . Online article at: http://adh.sagepub.com/cgi/content/abstract/10/5/671.
C.L. Polsfuss & A.Ardichvili, "State of Mind as the Master Competency for High-Performance Leadership", Organizational Development Journal, Volume 27, Number 3, Fall 2009.

Parenting
J. Pransky, Parenting from the Heart: A Guide to the Essence of Parenting, Authorhouse 2001 ,

Prevention
J. Pransky, Prevention from the Inside Out, Authorhouse 2003. , 
J. Pransky and L. Carpenos, Healthy Feeling/Thinking/Doing from the Inside Out: A Middle School Curriculum and Guide for the Prevention of Violence and Other Problem Behaviors, SaferSocietyPress 2000. , 
K. Marshall, Resilience in our Schools: Discovering Mental Health and Hope from the Inside-Out. in Persistently Safe Schools 2005: The National Conference of the Hamilton Fish Institute on School and Community Violence. Retrieved on October 31, 2007.

Recovery/substance abuse
J. Bailey, The Serenity Principle: Finding Inner Peace in Recovery, HarperSanFrancisco, 1990. ,

Relationships
G. Pransky, The Relationship Handbook, Pransky and Associates, 2001. ,

Youth 
 A. Chen Mills-Naim, The Spark Inside: A Special Book for Youth, Lone Pine Publishing. 2005. , 
 T.M.Kelley,  A critique of social bonding and control theory of delinquency using the principles of psychology, Adolescence Vol. 31 Issue 122, 1996, pp. 321–38.
 T. M. Kelley, Health Realization: A Principle-Based Psychology of Positive Youth Development, Child & Youth Care Forum, Vol. 32, Issue 1, 2003, pp. 47–72.
 T.M. Kelley, Positive Psychology and Adolescent Mental Health: False Promise or True Breakthrough? Adolescence, June 22, 2004
 T.M. Kelley, & S.A. Stack, Thought Recognition, Locus of Control, and Adolescent Well-being, Adolescence, Vol. 35 Issue 139, 2000, pp. 531–51.

Sydney Banks 
 S. Banks, Dear Liza, Lone Pine Publishing 2004. , 
 S. Banks, The Enlightened Gardener, Lone Pine Publishing 2001. , 
 S. Banks, The Enlightened Gardener Revisited, Lone Pine Publishing 2006. , 
 S. Banks, In Quest of the Pearl, Duvall-Bibb Publishing 1989. , 
 S. Banks, The Missing Link: Reflections on Philosophy and Spirit, Lone Pine Publishing 1998. , 
 S. Banks, Second Chance, Duvall-Bibb Publishing 1983. ,

External links 
 Orchestrating Your Thoughts
 Coaching from the Inside Out
 Michael Neill
 George Pransky
 
 The Natural Remedy for Stress and Burnout:  An Online Non-Credit Course in HR/Innate Health from West Virginia Univ.
 Vantage Place Organizational resources.
 Center for Sustainable Change 
 Free audio and video resources

Community